The 1949–50 Polska Liga Hokejowa season was the 15th season of the Polska Liga Hokejowa, the top level of ice hockey in Poland. Four teams participated in the final round, and KTH Krynica won the championship.

Qualification

First round 
 Stal Siemianowice - Kolejarz Torun 2:7

Semifinal 
 Kolejarz Torun - Piast Cieszyn 3:2/5:2

Final Tournament

Final
 KTH Krynica - Górnik Janów 10:1

External links
 Season on hockeyarchives.info

Polska
Polska Hokej Liga seasons
1949–50 in Polish ice hockey